Marc Trachtenberg (born February 9, 1946) is a professor of Political Science at the University of California, Los Angeles. He received his Ph.D in History from the University of California, Berkeley in 1974 and taught for many years for the history department at the University of Pennsylvania before coming to UCLA. He is the author of the following books : Reparation in World Politics: France and European Economic Diplomacy, 1916-1923 (Columbia University Press, 1980), A Constructed Peace: The Making of the European Settlement, 1945-1963 (Princeton University Press, 1999), History and Strategy (Princeton University Press, 1991) and The Craft of International History: A Guide to Method (Princeton University Press, 2006).

Trachtenberg was a Woodrow Wilson Fellow in 1966–1967, a Guggenheim Fellow in 1983–1984, a German Marshall Fund Fellow in 1994–1995, and an Adjunct Research Fellow at the John F. Kennedy School of Government's Center for Science and International Affairs in 1986–1987. In 2000 he received the American Historical Association's George Louis Beer Prize. He maintains a website dedicated to Cold War research.

References

Further reading
 Trachtenberg, Marc. "H-Diplo Essay 313- Marc Trachtenberg on Learning the Scholar's Craft" online Feb. 2020
 CV and links to his articles
 Profile page at UCLA Department of Political Science

External links
 Trachtenberg's Cold War studies website

1946 births
University of California, Los Angeles faculty
UC Berkeley College of Letters and Science alumni
Living people

American political scientists